Frank Walter Snook (born March 28, 1949) is a former relief pitcher in Major League Baseball who played for the San Diego Padres in its 1973 season. Listed at 6' 2", 180 lb., Snook batted and threw right-handed. 

Born in Somerville, New Jersey, Snook attended Hunterdon Central Regional High School.

Snook never won a game in MLB but did pick up one save. It occurred on September 8, 1973 during an extra innings victory over the rival LA Dodgers.

References

External links
, or Retrosheet, or Pelota Binaria (Venezuelan Winter League)

1949 births
Living people
Alexandria Aces players
American expatriate baseball players in Mexico
Baseball players from New Jersey
Cardenales de Lara players
American expatriate baseball players in Venezuela
Grand Canyon Antelopes baseball players
Hawaii Islanders players
Hunterdon Central Regional High School alumni
Indios de Ciudad Juárez (minor league) players
Major League Baseball pitchers
Mexican League baseball pitchers
Sportspeople from Somerville, New Jersey
San Diego Padres players
Sportspeople from Somerset County, New Jersey
Syracuse Chiefs players
Tri-City Padres players